David 'Dave' Watson (1900–1982) was an Australian rugby league footballer who played in the 1920s and 1930s. He was a multi premiership winner with South Sydney, and later a coach of the club.

Playing career
Dave Watson, was a legendary South Sydney player from their golden era of the late 1920s. He played 9 seasons for South Sydney between 1923 and 1931, playing a total of 153 grade games for Souths during his long career. Dave Watson played in six grand finals for Souths between 1923–29 and won four premierships with them in 1926, 1927, 1928 and 1929. He was also selected to play for New South Wales on 2 occasions in 1929.

Coaching career
He also coached South Sydney from 1935 to 1936, and from 1947 to 1949. He later went on to work for Souths and a Selector and committeeman, and later as a state and Kangaroo selector for the NSWRFL. As a national selector, Watson famously did not vote for Bob McCarthy to be selected on the 1967–68 Kangaroo Tour, after McCarthy had a stellar season – a grudge that Bob McCarthy still carries to this day.

The South Sydney website states that Dave Watson was awarded Life Membership of the Rabbitohs in 1962, and that he died in 1982 aged 82

References

1900 births
1982 deaths
Australian rugby league administrators
Australian rugby league coaches
Australian rugby league players
New South Wales rugby league team players
Rugby league locks
Rugby league second-rows
South Sydney Rabbitohs coaches
South Sydney Rabbitohs players